The following is a list of Sheikh-ul-Islams of the Ottoman Empire. After the foundation of the Empire around 1300, the title of Sheikh-ul-Islam, formerly used in the Abbasid Caliphate, was given to a leader authorized to issue legal opinion or fatwa. During the reign of Sultan Murad II, (1421-1444, 1446-1451) the position became an official title, with authority over other muftis in the Empire. In the late 16th century, Shaykh al-Islam were assigned to appoint and dismiss supreme judges, high ranking college professors, and heads of Sufi orders. Prominent figures include Zenbilli Ali Cemali Efendi (1445-1526), Ibn-i Kemal (Kemalpasazade) (1468-1533), Ebussuud Efendi (1491-1574) and Muhammad Zahid al-Kawthari (1879-1952).

List
During the existence of the office (from 1424 to 1922), there were in total 131 Sheikh-ul-Islams. The longest-serving officeholder was Ebussuud Efendi for 29 years, the shortest was Memikzade Mustafa Efendi for 13 hours.

1. Molla Şemseddin Fenari (1424–1430)
2. Molla Fahrettin Acemi (1430–1460)
3. Molla Hüsrev (1460–1480)
4. Molla Gürâni (1480–1488)
5. Molla Abdülkerim (1488–1495)
6. Alaettin Çelebi (1495–1496)
7. Efdalzade Hamidettin (1496–1503)
8. Zenbilli Muhammed Ali Effendi ben Ahmad ben Muhammad El Cemali (1503-1526) شيخ الإسلام أبي محمد بن أحمد بن محمد الجمالي
9. Kemalpaşazade Ahmet Şemsettin Efendi (Ibn-i Kemal) (1526–1534)
10. Sadullah Sadi Efendi (1534–1539)
11. Çivizade Muhittin Mehmet Efendi (1539–1542)  
12. Hamidi Abdülkadir Efendi (1542–1543)
13. Fenerizade Muhittin Efendi (1543–1545)
14. Ebussuud Efendi (1545–1574)
15. Hamit Mahmut Efendi (1574–1577)
16. Kadızade Ahmet Şemsettin Efendi (1577–1580)
17. Malulzade Mehmet Efendi (1580–1582)
18. Çivizade Hacı Mehmet Efendi (1582–1587) 
19. Müeyyetzade Abdülkadir Efendi (1587–1589)
20. Bostanzade Mehmet Efendi (1589–1592)
21. Bayramzade Hacı Zekeriya Efendi (1592–1593)
 Bostanzade Mehmet Efendi (1593–1598), 2nd time
22. Hoca Sadeddin Efendi (1598–1599)
23. Hacı Mustafa Sunullah Efendi (1599–1601)
24. Hocasadettinzade Mehmet Çelebi Efendi (1601–1603)
 Hacı Mustafa Sunullah Efendi (1603), 2nd time
25. Ebülmeyamin Mustafa Efendi (1603–1604)
 Hacı Mustafa Sunullah Efendi (1604–1606), 3rd time
 Ebülmeyamin Mustafa Efendi (1606), 2nd time
 Hacı Mustafa Sunullah Efendi (1606–1608), 4th time
 Hocasadettinzade Mehmet Çelebi Efendi (1608–1615), 2nd term
26. Hocazade Esad Efendi (1615–1622)
27. Zekeriyazade Yahya Efendi (1622–1623)
 Hocazade Esad Efendi (1623–1625), 2nd time
 Zekeriyazade Yahya Efendi (1625–1632), 2nd time
28. Ahizade Hüseyin Efendi (1632–1634)
 Zekeriyazade Yahya Efendi (1634–1644), 3rd time
29. Esatpaşazade Ebu Sait Mehmet Efendi (1644–1646)
30. Muid Ahmet Efendi (1646–1647)
31. Hacı Abdürrahim Efendi (1647–1649)
32. Bahai Mehmet Efendi (1649–1651)
33. Karaçelebizade Abdülaziz Efendi (1651)
34. Esatefendizade Ebu Sait Mehmet Efendi (1651–1652)
 Bahai Mehmet Efendi (1652–1654), 2nd term
 Esatefendizade Ebu Sait Mehmet Efendi (1654–1655), 2nd time
35. Hüsamzade Abdurrahman Efendi (1655–1656)
36. Memikzade Mustafa Efendi (1656)
37. Hocazade Mesut Efendi (1656)
38. Hanefi Mehmet Efendi (1656)
39. Balizade Mustafa Efendi (1656–1657)
40. Bolevi Mustafa Efendi (1657–1659)
41. Esiri Mehmet Efendi (1659–1662)
42. Sunizade Seyit Mehmet Emin Efendi (1662)
43. Minkarizade Yahya Efendi (1662–1674)
44. Çatalcalı Ali Efendi (1674–1686)
45. Ankaravi Mehmet Emin Efendi (1686–1687)
46. Debbağzade Mehmet Efendi (1687–1688)
47. Hacı Feyzullah Efendi (1688)
 Debbağzade Mehmet Efendi (1688–1690), 2nd time
48. Ebusaitzade Feyzullah Feyzi Efendi (1690–1692)
 Çatalcalı Ali Efendi (1692), 2nd time
 Ebusaitzade Feyzullah Feyzi Efendi (1692–1694), 2nd time
49. Sadık Mehmet Efendi (1694–1695)
50. İmam Mehmet Efendi (1695)
 Hacı Feyzullah Efendi (1695–1703), 2nd time
51. Paşmakçızade Seyit Ali Efendi (1703)  
52. Yekçeşm Hüseyin Efendi (1703)
 İmam Mehmet Efendi (1703–1704), 2nd time
 Paşmakçızade Seyit Ali Efendi (1704–1707), 2nd term
 Sadık Mehmet Efendi (1707–1708), 2nd time
53. Ebezade Abdullah Efendi (1708–1710)
 Paşmakçızade Seyit Ali Efendi (1710–1712), 3rd term
 Ebezade Abdullah Efendi (1712–1713), 2nd term
54. Mehmet Ataullah Efendi (1713)
55. İmam Mahmut Efendi (1713–1714)
56. Mirza Mustafa Efendi (1714–1715)
57. Menteşzade Abdürrahman Efendi (1715–1716)
58. Ebu İshak İsmail Naim Efendi (1716–1718)
59. Yenişehirli Abdullah Efendi (1718–1730)
60. Mirzazade Şeyh Mehmet Efendi (1730–1731)
61. Paşmakçızade Abdullah Efendi (1731–1732)
62. Damatzade Ebulhayr Ahmet Efendi (1732–1733)
63. Ebuishakzade İshak Efendi (1733–1734)
64. Dürri Mehmet Efendi (1734–1736)
65. Seyit Mustafa Efendi (1736–1745)
66. Pirizade Mehmet Sahip Efendi (1745–1746)
67. Hayatizade Mehmet Emin Efendi (1746)
68. Seyit Mehmet Zeynelabidin Efendi (1746–1748)
69. Ebuishakzade Mehmet Esat Efendi (1748–1749)
70. Mehmet Sait Efendi (1749–1750)
71. Seyit Murtaza Efendi (1750–1755)
72. Abdullah Vassaf Efendi (1755)
73. Damatzade Feyzullah Efendi (1755–1756)
74. Dürrizade Mustafa Efendi (1756–1757)
 Damatzade Feyzullah Efendi (1757–1758), 2nd term
75. Mehmet Salih Efendi (1758–1759)
76. Çelebizade İsmail Asım Efendi (1759–1760)
77. Hacı Veliyettin Efendi (1760–1761)
78. Tirevi Ahmet Efendi (1761–1762)
 Dürrizade Mustafa Efendi (1762–1767), 2nd time
 Hacı Veliyettin Efendi (1767–1768), 2nd time
79. Pirizade Osman Sahip Efendi (1768–1770)
80. Mirzazade Seyit Mehmet Sait Efendi (1770–1773)
81. Şerifzade Seyit Mehmet Şerif Efendi (1773–1774)
 Dürrizade Mustafa Efendi (1774), 3rd time
82. İvazpaşazade İbrahim Bey Efendi (1774–1775)
83. Salihzade Mehmet Emin Efendi (1775–1776)
84. Vassafzade Mehmet Esat Efendi (1776–1778)
85. Mehmet Şerif Efendi (1778–1782)
86. Seyit İbrahim Efendi (1782–1783)
87. Dürrizade Seyit Mehmet Ataullah Efendi (1783–1785)
 İvazpaşazade İbrahim Bey Efendi (1785), 2nd time
88. Arapzade Ahmet Ataullah Efendi (1785)
89. Dürrizade Seyit Mehmet Arif Efendi (1785–1786)
90. Müftizade Ahmet Efendi (1786–1787)
91. Mekki Mehmet Efendi (1787–1788)
92. Seyit Mehmet Kamil Efendi (1788–1789)
 Mehmet Şerif Efendi (1789), 2nd time
93. Hamitzade Mustafa Efendi (1789–1791)
94. Seyit Yahya Tevfik Efendi (1791)
 Mekki Mehmet Efendi (1791–1792), 2nd time
 Dürrizade Seyit Mehmet Arif Efendi (1792–1798), 2nd time
95. Mustafa Aşir Efendi (1798–1800)
96. Sâmânizade Ömer Hulusi Efendi (1800–1803)
97. Salihzade Ahmet Esat Efendi (1803–1806)
98. Şerifzade Mehmet Ataullah Efendi (1806–1807)
 Sâmânizade Ömer Hulusi Efendi (1807), 2nd time
 Şerifzade Mehmet Ataullah Efendi (1807–1808), 2nd time
99. Arapzade Mehmet Arif Efendi (1808)
 Salihzade Ahmet Esat Efendi (1808), 2nd time
100. Dürrizade Seyit Abdullah Efendi (1808–1810)
 Sâmânizade Ömer Hulusi Efendi (1810–1812), 3rd time
 Dürrizade Seyit Abdullah Efendi (1812–1815), 2nd time
101. Mehmet Zeynelabidin Efendi (1815–1818)
102. Mekkizade Mustafa Asım Efendi (1818–1819)
103. Hacı Halil Efendi (1819–1821)
104. Yasincizade Abdülvehhap Efendi (1821–1822)
105. Sıtkızade Ahmet Reşit Efendi (1822–1823)
 Mekkizade Mustafa Asım Efendi (1823–1825), 2nd time
106. Kadızade Mehmet Tahir Efendi (1825–1828)
 Yasincizade Abdülvehhap Efendi (1828–1833), 2nd time
 Mekkizade Mustafa Asım Efendi (1833–1846), 3rd time
107. Ahmet Arif Hikmet Bey Efendi (1846–1854)
108. Meşrepzade Mehmet Arif Efendi (1854–1858)
109. Seyit Mehmet Sadettin Efendi (1858–1863)
110. Atıfzade Ömer Hüsamettin Efendi (1863–1866)
111. Hacı Mehmet Refik Efendi (1866–1868)
112. Hasan Fehmi Efendi (1868–1871)
113. Ahmed Muhtar Molla Bey Efendi (1871–1872)
114. Turşucuzade Ahmet Muhtar Efendi (1872–1874)
115. Hasan Hayrullah Efendi (1874)
 Hasan Fehmi Efendi (1874–1876), 2nd time
 Hasan Hayrullah Efendi (1876–1877), 2nd time
116. Kara Halil Efendi (1877–1878)
 Ahmed Muhtar Molla Bey Efendi (1878), 2nd time
117. Uryanizade Ahmed Esad Efendi (1878–1889)
118. Bodrumlu Ömer Lütfi Efendi (1889–1891)
119. Mehmet Cemaleddin Efendi (1891–1909)
120.  (1909)
121.  (1909)
122.  (1910)
123.  (1910–1911)
124.  (1911–1912)
 Mehmet Cemaleddin Efendi (1912–1913), 2nd time
125. Mehmet Esat Efendi (1913–1914)
126. Ürgüplü Mustafa Hayri Efendi (1914–1916)
 Musa Kazım Efendi (1916–1918), 2nd time
127. Ömer Hulusi Efendi (1918)
128. Haydarizade İbrahim Efendi (1918–1919)
129. Mustafa Sabri Efendi (1919)
 Haydarizade İbrahim Efendi (1919–1920), 2nd time
130. Dürrizade Abdullah Efendi (1920)
 Mustafa Sabri Efendi (1920), 2nd time
131. Medeni Mehmet Nuri Efendi (1920–1922)

References

Sources
Yakut, Esra. Şeyhülislamlık: yenileşme döneminde devlet ve din. Istanbul: Kitap Yayınevi, 2005. For a list of şeyḫülislāmları, see pp. 242–247.

Fatwas

Ottoman Empire-related lists
Islamic religious leaders
Religious leaders
Lists of Islamic religious leaders
Islamic scholars from the Ottoman Empire
Shaykh al-Islāms